The Tūtaekurī River starts near the Hope Pass, in the Southern Alps and flows north-west to join the Ahaura River. The Ahaura joins the Grey River which flows to the Tasman Sea at Greymouth. Tūtaekurī River has been its official name since 21 June 2019. Tūtae kurī is a grass with the latin name agropyron multiflorum.

The Tūtaekurī flows down a long, low valley and is predominantly a shingle bed river flowing through beech forest with a margin of tussock grass along the banks. It can be kayaked, except during summer droughts.

A pack-track ran to Canterbury via the  Hope Pass and the Hope River. In 1875 it was the route recommended for what later became the Midland Railway, on a route further southwest. It was still being considered in 1887. A route is still used over the pass, taking about 7 hours for the walk to Top Hope Hut from Tutaekuri Hut. A 4x4 track runs to the hut, but is often washed out at the river crossings. In the opposite direction, the Elizabeth Hut on the Haupiri River can be reached in about 9 hours, via the  Trent Saddle, on the Elizabeth Hut Route.

The valley is part of the West Coast Divide TB Management Area, where pigs, deer and possums are controlled to minimise the spread of tuberculosis.

See also 

 List of rivers of New Zealand

References 

 Land Information New Zealand - Search for Place Names

Grey District
Rivers of the West Coast, New Zealand
Rivers of New Zealand